= Satan on Earth =

1919 film

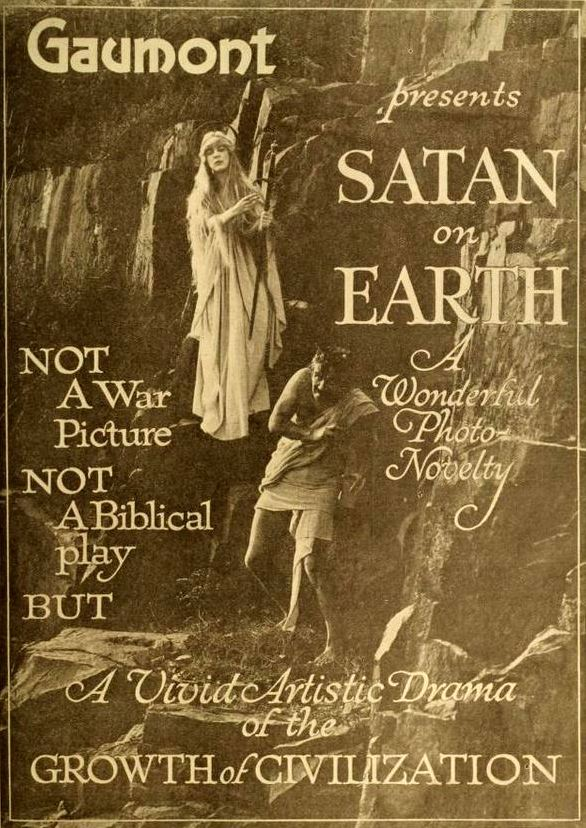
Advertisement for Satan on Earth from the January 25, 1919 issue of Moving Picture World

Satan on Earth is the 1919 US title of a 2-reel silent short subject produced in France by Gaumont.

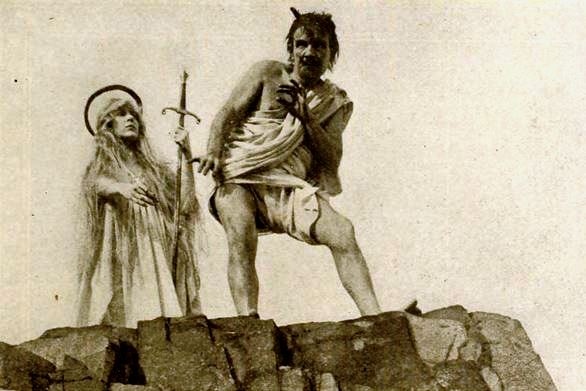
Scene from the film
